Nijat Azad oglu Abasov (born 14 May 1995) is an Azerbaijani chess grandmaster. In February 2020, he reached his all-time-highest rating of 2670 and was ranked as No. 3 in Azerbaijan and No. 67 in the world.

Early years
Abasov was awarded the title of International Master in 2009. He gained his third and final norm required for the title of Grandmaster in the Azerbaijani Solidarity Day event in late December 2010, in which he placed first. FIDE awarded him the title in February 2011.

Professional career
In November 2015, Abasov won the Cultural Village tournament in Wijk aan Zee to qualify for the 2016 Tata Steel Challengers tournament. In this latter he scored 6½ points out of 13. Abasov played on team Azerbaijan 2 in the 42nd Chess Olympiad in Baku. In late December 2016, he won the Zurich Christmas Open on tiebreak from Viktor Láznička, Dennis Wagner, Christian Bauer and Mateusz Bartel. In 2017, Abasov won both the Azerbaijani Chess Championship and the Baku Open tournament.

In October 2019, Nijat earned 6.5 points (+2=9-0) in the FIDE Grand Swiss Tournament, finishing 15th out of 154 players. In November that year, Abasov climbed to #93 in the world rankings and entered FIDE Top 100 for the first time in his career.

Notes

External links
 
 
 
 
 

1995 births
Living people
Chess grandmasters
Chess players from Baku

abasov is masterassain on lichess